A. S. Woodruff and Law Buildings is located in Camden, Camden County, New Jersey, United States. The building was built in 1920 and was added to the National Register of Historic Places on August 24, 1990.

See also
National Register of Historic Places listings in Camden County, New Jersey

References

Commercial buildings on the National Register of Historic Places in New Jersey
Colonial Revival architecture in New Jersey
Commercial buildings completed in 1920
Buildings and structures in Camden, New Jersey
National Register of Historic Places in Camden County, New Jersey
New Jersey Register of Historic Places